Francis Scott Key High School (FSK or simply "Key") is a four-year public high school in Union Bridge in Carroll County, Maryland, United States. The school is located near the west-central section of Carroll County.

About the school

Francis Scott Key High School was established in 1959 in Union Bridge, Maryland as part of the Carroll County Public School system.  The school is named after Francis Scott Key, the Frederick County, Maryland native author of the Star Spangled Banner, the national anthem for the United States. The building occupies  and was built in 1959.

The school celebrated their 50th Anniversary during the 2008-2009 school year.

Students
The student population at FSK steadily increased from 1993 to 2007, as shown by the list below.  The graduation rate has fluctuated between 85% and 96% over the same time period. The student body is 12% minority as of 2021.

Student population 
2007 	1,284
2006 	1,233
2005 	1,227
2004 	1,193
2003 	1,155
2002 	1,138
2001 	1,096
2000 	1,098
1999 	1,078
1998 	1,026
1997 	1,002
1996 	964
1995 	917
1994 	858
1993 	806

Some clubs and organizations are : Debate Team, Fellowship of Christian Athletes, Academic Team (2006 county champions), SGA, Best Buddies, FFA, Robotics club, and Key Club.

Sports
The superintendent of Carroll County Public Schools announced an investigation into the school's boys lacrosse team on May 11, 2021, arising from a complaint of racism during a game with Manchester Valley High School on May 10, 2021. Some Francis Scott Key players repeatedly hurled the "n-word" at a minority player for Manchester Valley, it was alleged. The Baltimore Sun quoted the superintendent as saying, "we're not going to tolerate this ... it needs to stop permanently".
 
Francis Scott Key High School has won the following state championships:

Volleyball

 1977  B 
 1978  B 
 1980  C 
 1986  C 
 1996  1A 
 2009  2A

Field Hockey

 1993  1A
 1989  1A co-champions 
 1986  C 
 1978  B
 1977  B

Boys' Soccer

 1985 - C 
 1986 - C

Boys' Track & Field

 1978 - B
 1987 - C 
 1990 - 1A
 1991 - 1A 
 1993 - 1A
 1996 - 1A 
 1997 - 1A

Notable alumni
 Guy Babylon - musician, played for Iron Butterfly and Elton John.

References and notes

External links
 Francis Scott Key High School website
 maps.google.com

Educational institutions established in 1959
Public high schools in Maryland
Carroll County Public Schools (Maryland)
Union Bridge, Maryland
1959 establishments in Maryland